

Kurt Leopold Pflugbeil (9 May 1890 – 31 May 1955) was a German general (General der Flieger) in the Luftwaffe during World War II who commanded 4th Air Corps and Luftflotte 1. He was a recipient of the Knight's Cross of the Iron Cross with Oak Leaves of Nazi Germany.

Pflugbeil commanded the 4th Air Corps during the Second Battle of Kharkov, Battle of Stalingrad and Siege of Sevastopol. He surrendered to the Red Army in the Courland Pocket in 1945. In 1950 he was sentenced to 25 years in a labour camp. Pflugbeil was released in 1954.

Awards and decorations
 Iron Cross (1914) 2nd Class (14 September 1914) & 1st Class (7 October 1916)

 Clasp to the Iron Cross (1939) 2nd Class (7 October 1939) & 1st Class (15 June 1940)
 Knight's Cross of the Iron Cross with Oak Leaves
 Knight's Cross on 5 October 1941 as Generalleutnant and commander of IV. Fliegerkorps
 562nd Oak Leaves on 27 August 1944 as General der Flieger and commander of Luftflotte 1

References

Citations

Bibliography

 
 Hayward, Joal S. A. The German use of air power at Kharkov, May 1942. Air Power History, Summer 1997, Volume 44, Number 2.
 

1890 births
1955 deaths
Luftwaffe World War II generals
Recipients of the Knight's Cross of the Iron Cross with Oak Leaves
German prisoners of war in World War II held by the Soviet Union
Generals of Aviators
Military personnel from Saxony
People from Königstein, Saxony